"Real World" is a song by American rock group Matchbox 20. It was released in March 1998 as the fourth single from their debut album, Yourself or Someone Like You. The single was initially ineligible to chart on the US Billboard Hot 100 due to not receiving a physical release in North America; it instead peaked at number nine on the Billboard Hot 100 Airplay chart in August 1998. However, in December 1998, the Hot 100 chart rules were changed to allow airplay-only singles to chart, and "Real World" became the band's first single to enter the listing, debuting and peaking at number 38. Worldwide, "Real World" reached number five in Canada and number 40 in Australia.

Content
The song was written by lead singer Rob Thomas, and details him wondering about what it would be like if he lived in various settings other than the current one, including a superhero, a rainmaker, and being a boss at a job, and if they would worsen or improve his life.

Music video
The music video, directed by Matthew Rolston, starts with Rob walking through a bowling alley with a camel. It then shows him on a street, where Kyle Cook is on an ice cream truck, but instead of selling ice cream, he unveils what appears to be a raw steak. Next, Rob is doing a news broadcast, with Brian Yale acting as a director. In the meantime, intercut with this is a diner with Paul Doucette dressed as a waitress, eventually discarding the outfit. In the midst of the news broadcast, we see what appears to be a breakfast cereal commercial with Adam Gaynor sitting with a family. The video concludes with the camera going back and forth between Rob with the camel and at the news station.

Track listings
European and Australian CD single
 "Real World" – 3:50
 "Long Day" (live) – 3:53
 "3am" (live) – 3:45

Japanese CD single
 "Real World"
 "Push" (live acoustic)
 "3am" (live acoustic)
 "Busted" (live acoustic)

Charts

Weekly charts

Year-end charts

Release history

References

External links
 Matchbox Twenty Biography on Yahoo! Music
 [ Billboard - Chart History]

1996 songs
1998 singles
Atlantic Records singles
East West Records singles
Lava Records singles
Matchbox Twenty songs
Music videos directed by Matthew Rolston
Song recordings produced by Matt Serletic
Songs written by Rob Thomas (musician)